Hecht (English: "Pike") was the name of two "wolfpacks" of German U-boats that operated during World War II.

First wolfpack "Hecht'
The first wolfpack code-named Hecht, comprising three U-boats, operated east of Iceland from 27 January to 4 February 1942.
During this period one Allied convoy passed through Hecht's patrol area, Arctic convoy PQ 9/10, comprising ten merchant ships bound for the Soviet Union. It departed Reykjavik on 1 February and was undetected, arriving without incident at Murmansk on 10 February. After this Hecht was disbanded, with U-352 and U-455 continuing to the North Atlantic, while U-435 remained on station for four more days before heading north to join patrol group Umbau in the Barents Sea.

U-boats, commanders and dates
 
  
 )

Second wolfpack "Hecht'
The second operated in the North Atlantic from 8 May to 18 June 1942.
After forming in the Atlantic on 8 May the Hecht boats headed west, sighting slow convoy ON 92 south of Iceland. They attacked over the next three days and sank seven ships without loss.

On 20 May Hecht boats sighted slow convoy ON 94 east of the Grand Banks, but lost it in fog.

On 31 May ON 96 was sighted south of Cape Farewell, but this was also lost in worsening weather.

On 8 June convoy ON 100 was sighted five days out from the UK; an attack developed which sank five ships and an escort vessel over four days, again without loss.

On 12 June convoy ON 102 was sighted, but attacks over three days and nights brought little success; one ship was sunk, but two U-boats were damaged so severely they had to return to base.

At this point BdU brought Hecht’s patrol to an end.

U-boats, commanders and dates
 , Otto von Bülow, 8–11 May
 , Otto Ites, 8 May–16 June
 , Johann Mohr, 8 May–18 June
 , Horst Dieterichs, 8 May–18 June
 , Hans-Peter Hinsch, 8 May–18 June
 , Heinrich Müller-Edzards, 8 May–18 June
 , Ernst-August Rehwinkel, 9–11 May
 , Hans-Jürgen Hellriegel, 11 May–18 June
 , Werner von Schmidt, 26–29 May

Ships hit by this wolfpack

From convoy ONS 92

Empire Dell & Llanover
Around 02:00 on 12 May 1942, U-124 fired three torpedoes and hit the 7,065-ton British CAM ship  and the 4,959-ton British collier Llanover. The Master, 38 crew and seven Royal Air Force personnel from Empire Dell were rescued before she sank. Two crew members were lost. Her crew of 46; Master, 39 men, and 6 gunners were rescued.

Cocle
At 03:40 on 12 May the 5,630-ton Panamanian merchant ship Cocle was torpedoed and sunk by U-94. Only 38 survivors from her crew of 42 were picked up by the British rescue ship Bury.

Cristales & Mount Parnes
At 03:55 on 12 May U-124 attacked again, firing two torpedoes and hitting the 5,389-ton British merchant ship Cristales and the 4,371-ton Greek merchant ship Mount Parnes. After her 33 crew abandoned ship, Mount Parnes was also scuttled by an escort vessel.

Batna
At 03:51 on 13 May, the 4,399-ton British collier Batna was torpedoed and sunk by U-94. One crew member was lost while the master, 34 crewmen and six gunners were picked up by the British rescue ship Bury.

Tolken
At 06:18 on 13 May, the 4,471-ton Swedish merchant ship Tolken was hit by a single torpedo from U-94. The U-boat was driven off by the convoy escorts, but returned at 09:30. Approaching the damaged ship on the surface, the U-boat was shot by the ship's machine guns. At 10:20 the U-boat attacked again with torpedoes. The first failed to explode, but the second five minutes later hit and sank the ship. There were no losses amongst the ship's crew of 34, and all were picked up by the British rescue ship Bury.

Independent passage

Maria da Gloria
At 22:10 on 5 June U-94 shelled an unmarked sailing ship. The ship stopped after being hit by two rounds, the U-boat ceased fire, and the crew abandoned ship. Then at 22:50 the schooner was sunk by U-boat's gunfire. She turned out to be the 320-ton neutral Portuguese fishing boat Maria da Gloria, and only 8 from her crew of 44 survived.

From convoy ONS 100

FFL Mimosa
At 04:10 on 9 June, the Free French Navy  Mimosa (J6254) was hit by one of two torpedoes fired by U-124, and sank immediately after the boilers exploded. The commander, 58 French sailors and 6 British sailors, were lost.

Empire Clough & Ramsay
At 03:40 hours on 10 June, U-94 fired three torpedoes at a group of three ships from the convoy, and hit and sank two British merchant ships; the 6,147-ton , and the 4,855-ton Ramsay.

Pontypridd
At 14:46 on 11 June, the 4,458-ton British merchant ship Pontypridd was hit by two torpedoes fired by  U-569, seriously damaging her. At 16:06, U-94 fired the coup de grâce at the straggling ship, which sank an hour later.

Dartford
At 06:12 on 12 June the 4,093-ton British merchant ship Dartford was torpedoed and sunk by U-124 south of Cape Race. The master, 25 crewmen and four gunners were lost, while 14 crewmen and three gunners were picked up by the British rescue ship Gothland.

From convoy ONS 102

Seattle Spirit
At about 06.20 on 18 June, U-124 fired two spreads of two torpedoes at three ships of Convoy ONS 102, en route from Murmansk to New York. One torpedo struck the 5,627-ton American merchant ship Seattle Spirit, causing flooding and a boiler explosion which killed one officer and two men below. The remaining 9 officers, 28 men, 11 armed guards (the ship was armed with a  gun, four .50 caliber and four .30 caliber machine guns) and 7 passengers abandoned ship in lifeboats. They were picked up by the corvette , and Seattle Spirit was shelled and sunk at 20:30 by Agassiz after it was determined she could not be salvaged.

References

Bibliography
 Blair, Clay (1996) Hitler's U-boat War Vol I 
 Edwards, Bernard (1996) Donitz and the Wolf Packs 
 Ruegg, Hague (1992) Convoys to Russia 1941-1945 World Ship Society 

Wolfpacks of 1942
Wolfpack Hecht